Riam or RIAM might refer to:

APBB1IP, a protein
Chao Chom Manda Riam (1770–1837), royal concubine of King Buddha Loetla Nabhalai of Siam
Riverside International Automotive Museum, the name of a defunct automotive museum in Riverside, California, U.S.
Royal Irish Academy of Music